Waffle Street is a 2015 American drama/comedy film directed by Eshom Nelms and Ian Nelms and starring Danny Glover and James Lafferty. It is a film adaptation of James Adams’ memoir of the same name, published by Sourced Media Books in 2010. The riches-to-rags story follows Adams’ journey of self-discovery and redemption after losing his job as vice president of a multi-billion dollar hedge fund and finding work as a server at a local 24-hour diner.

Waffle Street was filmed in Lehi, Utah in 2014, with most of the scenes being filmed in a local diner called One Man Band. It was named winner of Best Narrative Feature at the 2015 Hollywood Film Festival, the Audience Award Best Feature at the 2015 Red Rock Film Festival, and the Andretta Carpe Diem Award for Best Film at the 2015 Woodstock Film Festival. It initially released on September 24, 2015.

Plot

In the aftermath of the 2008 market crash, James “Jimmy” Adams (James Lafferty) gets laid off from his Wall Street hedge fund manager job. Feeling a sense of guilt for his role in the financial crisis, Adams decides to find a more honest and gratifying job than his previous profession.  After several unsuccessful efforts applying to a variety of blue-collar jobs, Adams is hired as a graveyard shift server at Papa’s Chicken and Waffles, a local 24-hour diner chain (the restaurant was renamed in new versions of the book and in the film).

Though many of his coworkers are ex-convicts, he begins to find unlikely friendships, especially with short-order cook Edward Collins (Danny Glover). Collins becomes somewhat of a mentor for Adams, teaching him valuable life lessons about hard work and finance from a fresh perspective. Adams soon sets his sights on owning the Papa’s franchise and works relentlessly to meet the 1000-hour minimum required. Tensions build between Adams and his wife, Becky (Julie Gonzalo), as he downgrades their house and cars to finance his goal.

Overall, his time working at Papa’s offers Adams new insights both professionally and personally. After six months at Papa’s Chicken and Waffles, Adams returns to the finance industry, this time focusing on financial planning and wealth management. He is seen assisting his former Papa’s colleagues with financial planning and business start-up advice.

Cast

Danny Glover as Edward Collins
James Lafferty as James “Jimmy” Adams
Julie Gonzalo as Becky Adams
Dale Dickey as Crazy Kathy
Adam Johnson as Matthew Linslow
Marshall Bell as Miles Drake III
Ernie Lively as Wright Adams
Yolanda Wood as Jaqui White
Aubrey Reynolds as Mary Lynn Parks
Michelle Lang as Nancy Linslow

Awards and selections

Winner Best Narrative Feature, Hollywood Film Festival 2015
Winner Audience Award Best Feature, Red Rock Film Festival 2015
Winner Andretta Carpe Diem Award, Woodstock Film Festival 2015
Winner Screenwriter Award, Coronado Island Film Festival 2016
Official Selection, Closing Night Film, Tallgrass Film Festival 2015
Official Selection, People’s Choice Competition Biff Year ‘Round 2015
Official Selection, Cucalorus Film Festival 2015
Official Selection, Macau International Movie Festival 2015
Official Selection, Heartland Film Festival 2015
Official Selection, On Location: Memphis Film Festival 2015
Official Selection, Ojai Film Festival 2015
Official Selection, Beloit International Film Festival 2016

References

External links 
 
 
 

2010s English-language films